Tim Handel (born 18 October 1996) is a German tennis player.

Handel has a career high ATP singles ranking of 515 achieved on 1 August 2022. He also has a career high ATP doubles ranking of 642 achieved on 16 May 2022.

Handel won his first major ITF title at the Luxoil Open ITF Trier in 2021.

Handel played college tennis at Northern Arizona University in Flagstaff, Arizona. He attended NAU from 2015 until 2019 and has a Bachelor's Degree in Business Marketing and Management.

ITF titles

Singles: 1 title

Doubles: 4 (1 title, 3 runner-ups)

Collegiate Career 
Handel played four years at the Northern Arizona University. He won three Big Sky Conference MVP Honors and qualified for the NCAA singles tournament in his last year. He became just the fourth men's tennis player in Big Sky history to win three MVP awards since it was first given out in 1983. 

Handel was the first Big Sky player to play in the NCAA Singles tournament since 2006 and just the 11th Big Sky conference player ever dating back to 1980.

References

External links 

1996 births
Living people
German male tennis players
People from Reutlingen
Northern Arizona Lumberjacks athletes